Serious Slammin' is the thirteenth studio album by the Pointer Sisters, released in 1988 by RCA Records.

History
Serious Slammin is the Pointer Sisters' 14th album in 15 years; it is the last record, to date, that the group made with longtime producer Richard Perry. Its first single, "He Turned Me Out" (also featured in the 1988 film Action Jackson), reached the R&B top 40.  A second single, the ballad "I'm in Love", also reached the R&B chart. Other songs of note include "Moonlight Dancing" (written by Diane Warren and later covered by Bette Midler), fan favorite "I Will Be There" and the title track, which was later covered by George Clinton. Serious Slammin is the Pointers' last album to chart on the Billboard Top 200 albums tally; it failed to make an entry on Billboard's R&B albums chart.

Track listing
"Serious Slammin'" (Gregg Crockett, Lelan Zales) - 4:28
"Shut Up and Dance" (Glen Ballard, Siedah Garrett) - 4:16
"Moonlight Dancing" (Diane Warren) - 4:52
"He Turned Me Out" (LeMel Humes, Marylee Kortes) - 4:12
"Flirtatious" (Jeff Pescetto, Tony Haynes) - 4:26
"My Life" (Remix) (Adele Bertei, David P. Bryant, Sandra Bernhard) - 4:49
"I'm in Love" (Jonathan Butler, Simon May) - 4:16
"Pride" (Jimmy Lang, Matthew Wilder) - 3:47
"Uh-Uh" (Jeanette Hawes, Ricky Lawson, Robert Barnes, Anthony T. Coleman) - 4:17
"I Will Be There" (Eddie Schwartz, David Tyson) - 4:47

 Personnel The Pointer Sisters Anita Pointer – vocals 
 June Pointer – vocals 
 Ruth Pointer – vocalsMusicians'
 Isaias Gamboa – acoustic piano solo (1), synthesizers (1), guitar (1), alternate bass (1), trombone (1), additional synthesizers (4)
 Gregg Crockett – additional synthesizers (1), guitar (1, 4), bass (1), drums (1), synth bass (3)
 John Bokowski – additional synthesizers (1, 2), synth horns (2), drums (2), synthesizers (3, 4), percussion (3, 4), keyboards (4), horns (4)
 Lelan Zales – additional synthesizers (1)
 Glen Ballard – clavinet (2), synthesizers (2), bass (2), synth bass (2)
 Paul Fox – additional keyboards (3), drum and percussion programming (3), synthesizers (6), drums (6)
 Guy Roche – synthesizers (3)
 Bob Mithoff – synthesizers (4), drum programming (4)
 LeMel Humes – synth bass (4)
 Pat Caddick – keyboards (5)
 Gregg Karukas – keyboards (5)
 David P. Bryant – synthesizers (6), drums (6)
 Jeff Lorber – Rhodes (7), synth bass (7), drum machine (7)
 Tony Coleman – clavinet (8), synthesizers (9), drums (9)
 Jim Lang – synthesizers (8), synth bass (8), drum machine (8)
 Matthew Wilder – organ (8), additional synthesizers (8)
 Richie Pagliari – keyboards (10)
 Ricky Timas – keyboards (10), bass (10), drums (10)
 Basil Fung – guitar (2)
 Paul Jackson Jr. – guitar (3, 6)
 Roland Bautista – guitar (9)
 Ricky Lawson – bass (9)
 Jeff Pescetto – drums (5)
 Peter Rafelson – percussion (4), guitar (7, 10), Rhodes (10), synthesizers (10), additional drums (10), effects (10)
 David Majal Li – saxophone (7)
 Sandra Bernhard – additional backing vocals (6)

Production 
 Producer – Richard Perry
 Associate Producers – James Reese (Tracks 1-4); Norman Whitfield, Jr. (Tracks 1, 2); Glen Ballard (Track 2); John Bokowski (Track 3); Jeff Pescetto (Track 5); David P. Bryant and Paul Fox (Track 6); Jeff Lorber (Track 7); Jim Lang and Matthew Wilder (Track 8); Tony Coleman and Ricky Lawson (Track 9); Ricky Timas (Track 10).
 Additional Production on Track 6 – Michael Barbiero and Steve Thompson 
 Vocals recorded by Michael Brooks
 Tracking Engineers – Francis Buckley (Tracks 1 & 2); Bob Mithoff (Track 4).
 Recording Engineers – Glen Holguin (Tracks 5 & 8); Francis Buckley (Track 6); Jeff Lorber (Track 7); Robert Brown (Track 9); Ted Blaidsell (Track 10).
 Additional Engineers – Michael Brooks, Robert Brown, Francis Buckley, Glen Holguin, Jeff Lorber, Ross Stein and Norman Whitfield, Jr. 
 Assistant Engineers – Bryan Arnett, Ken Felton, Cliff Jones, Robin Laine, Kraig Miller, Richard Platt and Jay Willis.
 Recorded at Studio 55, Studio Masters and Skip Saylor Recording (Los Angeles, CA); JHL Studios (Pacific Palisades, CA); Mithoff Studio; Rafelson Recording.
 Mixing – Norman Whitfield, Jr. (Tracks 3 & 4); John Potoker (Tracks 5, 7, 9 & 10); Mick Guzauski (Track 8).
 Remixing on Track 6 – Michael Barbiero and Steve Thompson 
 Remixed at Studio 55, Record Plant and Conway Studios (Los Angeles, CA); Mediasound (New York, NY).
 Mastered by Brian Gardner at Bernie Grundman Mastering (Hollywood, CA).
 Production Coordination – Cheryl Henning and Scott Maddox
 Production Manager – James C. Tract
 A&R Direction – Paul Atkinson and Erik Nuri
 Art Direction and Design – John Kosh
 Photography – Herb Ritts
 Management – Gallin Morrey Associates

Charts

References

External links
 

1988 albums
The Pointer Sisters albums
Albums produced by Richard Perry
RCA Records albums